Human Era is the fourth studio album from American hard rock band Trixter.  Released on the Frontiers Records label, the album was released on June 5, 2015.

A video for "Human Era" was released on June 25, 2015.

Track listing 
 Rockin' To The Edge Of The Night
 Crash That Party
 Not Like All The Rest
 For You
 Every Second Counts
 Beats Me Up
 Good Times Now
 Midnight In Your Eyes
 All Night Long
 Soul Of A Lovin' Man
 Human Era
 Always A Victim (acoustic version - bonus track iTunes)
 Road Of A Thousand Dreams (re-recorded version - bonus track iTunes)

Personnel 
 Pete Loran (lead vocals/rhythm guitar)
 Steve Brown (lead guitar/harmonica/backing vocals)
 P.J. Farley (bass/backing vocals) 
 Gus Scott (drums/percussion/backing vocals)

References 

2015 albums
Trixter albums
Frontiers Records albums